Ramón "Moncho" Gil Sequeiros (16 August 1897 – 18 January 1965) was a Spanish footballer player who played as a forward. He was a member of the Spain national team that won the silver medal at the 1920 Summer Olympics.

Club career
Born in Vigo, he began playing football at his hometown club Real Vigo Sporting in 1917, and he helped them win three Galician Championships in 1918-19, 1919-20 and 1922-23. He played for them until 1923, when Sporting was merged with Fortuna de Vigo to form Celta de Vigo. He was then part of the first-ever teams fielded by Celta de Vigo and played for them for four seasons.

International career
He represented the Spain national team at the 1920 Summer Olympics, featuring in two games against Italy and in the Silver/Bronze medal match against the Netherlands which Spain won 3-1.

Being a player of Real Vigo Sporting, he was summoned to play for the Galicia national team, and he was one of the eleven footballers that played in the team's first-ever game on 19 November 1922, a 4-1 win over a Castile/Madrid XI in the quarter-finals of the 1922-23 Prince of Asturias Cup, an inter-regional competition organized by the RFEF. Moncho Gil helped the team reach the final, where they were beaten 1-3 by Asturias national team, courtesy of a second-half brace from José Luis Zabala.

Honours

Club
Real Vigo Sporting
Galician Championship:
Winners (3) 1918-19, 1919-20 and 1922-23

International
Spain
Olympic Games Silver medal: 1920

Asturias
Prince of Asturias Cup:
Runner-up (1): 1922-23

References

External links
 
 

1897 births
1965 deaths
Spanish footballers
Spain international footballers
Footballers at the 1920 Summer Olympics
Olympic footballers of Spain
Olympic silver medalists for Spain
RC Celta de Vigo players
Olympic medalists in football
Footballers from Vigo
Medalists at the 1920 Summer Olympics
Association football forwards